Jabairpur is a small town and eastern suburb of Chakwal in Chakwal District in the Punjab province of Pakistan.

References

Populated places in Chakwal District